Tandikat is a stratovolcano in West Sumatra, Indonesia.  Its elevation is 2,438 m (7,999 ft). It is a twin volcano with Mount Singgalang, which is located to the north-north-east of Tandikat. However, only Tandikat has had historical volcanic activity. The city of Padang Panjang is located at the foot of the mountain.

See also 
 List of volcanoes in Indonesia

References
 
 Indonesian Directorate of Volcanology and Geological Hazard Mitigation entry

Stratovolcanoes of Indonesia
Subduction volcanoes
Active volcanoes of Indonesia
Volcanoes of Sumatra
Mountains of Sumatra
Landforms of West Sumatra
Holocene stratovolcanoes